Zarechnoye is a rural locality (a selo) in Krasnoarmeysky Selsoviet, Kizlyarsky District, Republic of Dagestan, Russia. The population was 856 as of 2010. There are 6 streets.

Geography 
Zarechnoye is located 19 km southwest of Kizlyar (the district's administrative centre) by road. Dubovskaya and Borozdinovskaya are the nearest rural localities.

Nationalities 
Avars, Dargins, Laks, Rutuls, Lezgins and Russians live there.

References 

Rural localities in Kizlyarsky District